There is a separate "Amos Alonzo Stagg Coaching Award".

The Amos Alonzo Stagg Award is presented annually by the American Football Coaches Association (AFCA) to the "individual, group or institution whose services have been outstanding in the advancement of the best interests of football".  Recipients receive a plaque which is a replica of the one given to Stagg at the 1939 AFCA Convention in tribute to his 50 years of service to football. The purpose of the award is "to perpetuate the example and influence of Amos Alonzo Stagg".

The award is named in honor of Amos Alonzo Stagg, who was instrumental in founding the AFCA in the 1920s. Stagg is considered one of the great innovators and motivating forces in the early development of the game of football and had one of the longest head coaching tenures in the history of the college game.

Winners

 1940 Donald Herring Jr.
 1941 Butch Cowell (posthumously)
 1942 No award given 1943 No award given 1944 No award given 1945 No award given 1946 Grantland Rice
 1947 William Alexander
 1948 Gil Dobie, Pop Warner, Robert Zuppke
 1949 Dick Harlow
 1950 No award given 1951 Tuss McLaughry
 1952 Bo McMillin
 1953 Lou Little
 1954 Dana X. Bible
 1955 Joseph J. Tomlin
 1956 No award given 1957 Robert Neyland
 1958 Bernie Bierman
 1959 John Wilce
 1960 Harvey Harman

 1961 Ray Eliot
 1962 Tad Wieman
 1963 Andrew Kerr
 1964 Don Faurot
 1965 Harry Stuhldreher
 1966 Bernie Moore
 1967 Jess Neely
 1968 Abe Martin
 1969 Rip Engle
 1970 Pappy Waldorf
 1971 William D. Murray
 1972 Jack Curtice
 1973 Lloyd Jordan
 1974 Jake Gaither
 1975 Gerald B. Zornow
 1976 No award given 1977 Ben Schwartzwalder
 1978 Tom Hamilton
 1979 Fritz Crisler
 1980 No award given 1981 Fred Russell

 1982 Eddie Robinson
 1983 Bear Bryant
 1984 Bud Wilkinson
 1985 Duffy Daugherty
 1986 Woody Hayes
 1987 Field Scovell
 1988 Herb McCracken
 1989 David M. Nelson
 1990 Len Casanova
 1991 Bob Blackman
 1992 Charles McClendon
 1993 Keith Jackson
 1994 Bob Devaney
 1995 John Merritt (posthumously)
 1996 Chuck Neinas
 1997 Ara Parseghian
 1998 Bob Reade 
 1999 Bo Schembechler
 2000 Tom Osborne
 2001 Vince Dooley
 2002 Joe Paterno

 2003 LaVell Edwards
 2004 Ron Schipper
 2005 Hayden Fry
 2006 Grant Teaff
 2007 Bill Curry
 2008 Bill Walsh (posthumously)
 2009 John Gagliardi 
 2010 Darrell Royal
 2011 Bobby Bowden
 2012 Fisher DeBerry
 2013 Frosty Westering
 2014 R. C. Slocum
 2015 Ken Hatfield
 2016 John Cooper
 2017 Don Nehlen
 2018 Frank Broyles (posthumously)
 2019 Marv Levy
 2020 Dick Tomey (posthumously)
 2021 No award given''
 2022 Mel Tjeerdsma

See also
Walter Camp Man of the Year
Walter Camp Distinguished American Award
Walter Camp Alumni of the Year
National Football Foundation Distinguished American Award
National Football Foundation Gold Medal Winners
Theodore Roosevelt Award (NCAA)
Walter Payton Man of the Year Award
"Whizzer" White NFL Man of the Year Award

References

External links
 Amos Alonzo Stagg Award

College football lifetime achievement awards
Awards established in 1940
1940 establishments in the United States